Mohammed Ghanim is a retired Qatari football player. He was part of the Al-Sadd team that won the 1988–89 Asian Club Championship. He scored an 85th-minute goal in Al-Saad's 3–2 first leg away defeat to Al-Rasheed. The goal eventually proved crucial; Al-Saad won the second leg 1–0, and therefore won the tournament on the away goals rule.

References

Qatari footballers
Living people
Al Sadd SC players
Qatar Stars League players
Al Ahli SC (Doha) players
Association footballers not categorized by position
Year of birth missing (living people)